David Hassell is an American businessperson. He is the founder and CEO of 15Five, an employee feedback system.

Career
In 1999, he co-founded AdClip Networks, an online advertising technology company aimed at creating alternatives to the predominant banner ads of the day, starting with online coupons that could be “clipped” off a web page. It was later re-branded as Endai Worldwide and focused more broadly on a variety of online marketing technologies and services.

An avid kitesurfer, Hassell attends an annual gathering of Silicon Valley CEOs and other tech-world entrepreneurs on Maui called MaiTai.

In 2010, Hassell co-founded Strategy Day with former President of the San Francisco chapter of Entrepreneurs' Organization, Rob Wensing, a consulting company that works with CEOs and executive teams to develop focus and accomplish strategic plans. At the same time, Hassell began work on a similar idea for facilitating communication within companies. This idea, 15Five, was launched in 2011.

15Five
The idea for 15Five originated with Patagonia founder Yvon Chouinard, who implemented a weekly "5-15 report" to keep track of his employees and business while he enjoyed his adventurous life. The idea behind 15Five is employees spend "15 minutes to write the reports and managers spend no more than 5 minutes to read them." The goal of the company is to provide fast and easy communication between managers and employees using an interface that Hassell says is based on the design value of "elegant simplicity."

In 2013, 15Five received $1 million in seed funding from venture capital firm Richmond Global, 500 Startups, and investments from individuals, including Yammer founder David O. Sacks, Ustream founder John Ham, former editor of Mashable Ben Parr, Ben Ling of Google and Xobni founder Matt Brezina.

Reception
Hassell has served as the President of the San Francisco chapter of Entrepreneurs' Organization, a global non-profit with the stated goal of helping entrepreneurs learn and grow. Inc., and VentureBeat.

References

External links
David Hassell on Twitter

Year of birth missing (living people)
Living people
Businesspeople from the San Francisco Bay Area